Madan Mohan Kohli (25 June 1924 – 14 July 1975), better known as Madan Mohan, was an Indian music director of the 1950s, 1960s and the 1970s. He is considered one of the most melodious and skilled music directors of the Hindi film industry. He is particularly remembered for the immortal ghazals he composed for Hindi films. Some of his best works are with singers Lata Mangeshkar, Mohammed Rafi and Talat Mahmood.

Early years
Born on 25 June 1924, at Baghdad where his father Rai Bahadur Chunilal Kohli was working as an Accountant General with the Iraqi Police forces, Madan Mohan spent the early years of his life in the Middle East. After 1932, his family returned to their home town of Chakwal, then in Jhelum district of Punjab, British India. He was left in the care of a grandparent while his father went to Bombay to seek business opportunities. He attended local school in Lahore for the next few years. During his stay at Lahore, he learnt the basics of classical music from one Kartar Singh for a very short period, however he never received any formal training in music. Some time later, his family moved to Mumbai where he completed his Senior Cambridge from St. Mary's School in Byculla Mumbai. In Mumbai, at the age of 11 years, he started performing in children's programmes broadcast by All India Radio. At age 17, he attended the Colonel Brown Cambridge School in Dehradun where he completed a year's training.

Career

Early career
He joined the Army as a Second Lieutenant in the year 1943. He served there for two years until end of World War II, when he left the Army and returned to Mumbai to pursue his musical interests. In 1946, he joined the All India Radio, Lucknow as Programme Assistant, where he came in contact with various artists such as Ustad Faiyaz Khan, Ustad Ali Akbar Khan, Begum Akhtar, and Talat Mahmood. During these days he would also compose music for programmes to be broadcast on All India Radio. In 1947, he was transferred to All India Radio, Delhi where he worked for a short period. He was very fond of singing, and so in 1947 he got his first chance to record two ghazals penned by Behzad Lucknawi, Aane Laga Hai Koi Nazar Jalwa Gar Mujhe and Is Raaz Ko Duniya Jaanti Hai. Soon after, in 1948 he recorded two more private ghazals penned by Deewan Sharar, Wo Aaye To Mahfil Mein Ithlaate Huye Aaye and Duniya Mujhe Kahti Hai Ke Main Tujhko Bhoolaa Doon. In 1948, he got his first opportunity to sing a film duet Pinjare Mein Bulbul Bole and  Mera Chhotasa Dil Dole with Lata Mangeshkar under composer Ghulam Haider (composer) for the film Shaheed, though these songs were never released or used in the film. Between 1946 and 1948, he assisted music composers S.D. Burman for Do Bhai, and Shyam Sundar in Actress.

Music director
He scored his first big break with the film Aankhen in 1950, which marked the beginning of a long lasting collaboration with Mohammed Rafi, his next film was Adaa which saw the beginning of a long lasting collaboration with Lata Mangeshkar; both would go on to sing for many of his films. Two of his composed songs for Sharabi - "Sawan ke maheeney mein" and "Kabhi na Kabhi koi na koi toh aayega", both filmed for Dev Anand are among the most well known renditions of Mohammed Rafi. In addition, his other compositions like "Wo Chup Rahen To" from the film Jahan Ara (1964) and "Maine Rang Li Aaj Chunariya" from Dulhan Ek Raat Ki (1966) are two similar examples. Madan was also able to write songs for male singers such as Talat Mahmood (Phir wahi Shaam, wahi gham, wahi tanhaayee hai, Main Teri Nazar Ka Suroor Hoon and Teri Aankh Ke Aansoo from Jahan Ara, and Meri Yaad Mein Tum Na from Madhosh) and Mohammed Rafi (Ek Haseen Shaam Ko from Dulhan Ek Raat Ki, Kisi Ki Yaad Mein from Jahan Ara, Main Nigahen Tere Chehere Se from Aap Ki Parchaiyian, Aap Ke Pehlun Mein Aakar Ro Diye from Mera Saaya, Ye Duniya Ye Mehfil Mere Kaam Ki Nahin from Heer Ranjha, Tere Dar Pe Aayaa Hoon from Laila-Majnu, the all-time haunting Meri Awaaz Suno and Tumhare Zulf Ke Sayen from Naunihal, Teri Aankhon Ke Siva Duniya Mein from Chiraag as well. Madan did not usually employ Kishore Kumar. Nonetheless, their partnership created songs as well; in this category fall songs such as Simti Si, Sharmai Si from Parwana, Zaroorat Hai, Zaroorat Hai from Manmauji, the title song from Ek Muthi Aasman, Mera Naam Abdul Rehman from Bhai Bhai, and Aai Hasino, Naazanino from Chacha Zindabad. Madan often collaborated with lyricists Raja Mehdi Ali Khan, Kaifi Azmi, and Rajinder Krishan, Sahir Ludhianvi and Majrooh Sultanpuri for his movies.

In 1957 he came out with a film named Dekh Kabira Roya in which the legendary singer Manna Dey gave his voice to the melodious Kaun Aaya Mere Man Ke Dwaare and unforgettable numbers like Tum Bin Jeevan Kaisa Jeevan in the film Bawarchi. In addition to that, he had Lata sing Tu Pyaar Kare Ya Thukraaye and Meri Veena Tum Bin Roye numbers, and he used Talat Mahmood for the song Hum Se Aaya Na Gaya in the same movie. Once in an interview Manna Dey recalled that Madan Mohan asked him to take special care when singing Kaun Aaya Mere Man Ke Dwaare.

A film scored by Madan was Chetan Anand's Haqeeqat (1964), starring Balraj Sahni and Dharmendra and based on the Sino-Indian War of 1962. In it, he used Rafi, who sang numbers like Kar chale hum fida, Main Yeh Soch Kar. Lata was used for the song Zara Si Aahat Hoti Hai and the unscreened " Khelo na mere dilse". And the same film saw Rafi, Talat, Manna Dey, and Bhupendra singing Hoke Majboor Mujhe Usne Bhulaya Hoga. Bhupendra appeared on the screen as well for the first time, much before he established himself as a playback singer. This song is also the only song in which four top-rated male playback singers have put voices together in a song. In 1966, he again paired with Lata Mangeshkar for Mera Saaya.

Madan Mohan's venture was Raj Khosla's version of "Woman in White", titled Woh Kaun Thi?. This film has three Lata solos ('Naina barse rim jhim rim jhim', 'Lag ja gale' and 'Jo humne daastaan apni sunayee') and a Lata duet.

The late fifties, sixties and the early seventies were the most productive period in Madan Mohan's career. His songs from those decades include compositions for films like Adalat, Anpadh, Dulhan ek raat ki, Mera Saya, Dastak, Hanste Zakhm, Heer Raanjha, Maharaja, and Mausam, among many others. His second last bow was for a film released five years after his death, Chalbaaz. In 1970, during the changing times of western music he gave music based on ragas for Rajinder Singh Bedi's Dastak and won his only 1971 National Film Award for Best Music Direction. Its songs sung by Lata Mangeshkar are still considered her finest.

His legacy wouldn't be complete without mentioning the ghazal he composed for the movie "Dil Ki Rahein" – "Rasm-e-ulfat ko nibhaein to nibhaein kaise". The shayar(lyricist) for the ghazal was Naqsh Lallayalpuri and it was sung by Lata Mangeshkar. It is considered one of the best songs sung by Lata Mangeshkar, ever.

Madan Mohan's son Sanjeev Kohli recreated 11 of his late father's unused compositions for the soundtrack of the 2004 Yash Chopra film Veer-Zaara. Later on, Kohli brought out an album "Tere Baghair" which contains some of Madan Mohan's songs.

Mass appeal
Lata Mangeshkar christened him "Ghazal ka Shehzadaa", or the Prince of Ghazals. Even Lata herself stated in a live concert in the late 1990s that she found Madan Mohan's compositions difficult to master. Most of the top film actors of the day (who were also studio heads) had fallen into a groove with their preferred composers (e.g., Raj Kapoor had Shankar Jaikishan, Dev Anand had the Burmans, Dilip Kumar had Naushad, etc.) Hence, he often had difficulty finding assignments. His 1964 Filmfare Award nomination for Best Music Director for Woh Kaun Thi. In a tightly contested race, both Madan and Shankar Jaikishan (Sangam) lost to relative newcomer Laxmikant Pyarelal, who scored Dosti.

Death and legacy
Madan's constant struggles took a toll on his life, and he began drinking heavily. He died of liver cirrhosis on 14 July 1975. His body was lifted before his funeral by actors – Rajesh Khanna, Dharmendra, Amitabh Bachchan and Rajendra Kumar.

In 2004, Madan's unused tunes were recreated by his son, Sanjeev Kohli, for the Yash Chopra film Veer-Zaara, starring Shahrukh Khan, Preity Zinta, and Rani Mukerji. The lyrics were written by Javed Akhtar, and Lata Mangeshkar was invited to once again sing the majority of the melodies composed by him. The music was highly appreciated and was critically acclaimed. He was awarded the IIFA award 2005, for Music Direction for Veer-Zaara.

Books on Madan Mohan
'Madan Mohan: An Unforgettable Composer – Edited by V M Joshi & Suresh Rao, presents an analytical look at the composer's work. It includes articles by Sanjeev Kohli, Akshay Kohli, O P Dutta, Uttam Singh, B R Ishara, Dr. Ashok Ranade, Alka Deo Marulkar, Mridula Joshi, Dr. Kirti Shrivastava, Deepak Jeswal and many more; interviews with Lata Mangeshkar, Shreya Ghoshal, Mahalaxmi Iyer and Rehana Sultan, and Madan Mohan's filmography.

Style
Madan's music was characterised by his immense ability to meld elements of Indian classical music into a new style of Hindi filmi song. He had a keen and sensitive ear for the nuances of Indian classical tunes, and combined them with elements of Western music such as harmonies to produce a style of music that could be appreciated by both classical music aficionados and the common person alike.

Filmography

See also 
 List of Indian film music directors

References

Bibliography

External links
 madanmohan.in, website on Madan Mohan, created and maintained by his sons
 
 Eternal composition called Madan Mohan, tribute piece on Madan Mohan

1924 births
1975 deaths
Musicians from Baghdad
Punjabi people
Deaths from cirrhosis
Alcohol-related deaths in India
Hindi film score composers
Best Music Direction National Film Award winners
20th-century Indian composers